Russell D. "Russ" Arnold (March 6, 1921 – January 27, 2012) was an American bridge player. He was world champion at the 1981 Bermuda Bowl and winner of nine North American titles.

Born in Winnipeg, Manitoba, Canada, he graduated from the University of Minnesota. Long-time from Miami, Florida, he was an accountant and partner in running a successful major appliance business and so did not play bridge often, making his achievements all the more remarkable.

Arnold was inducted into the ACBL Hall of Fame in 2011 as recipient of the annual Von Zedtwitz Award, which recognizes players who have achieved prominence in the game and have an outstanding tournament record but who may not have been in the limelight for some years".

Bridge accomplishments

Honors

 ACBL Hall of Fame, von Zedtwitz Award 2011

Wins

 North American Bridge Championships (9)
 Grand National Teams (1) 1973 
 Vanderbilt (2) 1980, 1993 
 Senior Knockout Teams (3) 1994, 1995, 1996 
 Reisinger (1) 1979 
 Spingold (2) 1963, 1985

Runners-up

 North American Bridge Championships
 Grand National Teams (1) 1980 
 Truscott Senior Swiss Teams (1) 2002 
 Vanderbilt (1) 1960 
 Senior Knockout Teams (1) 1997 
 Spingold (1) 1987

References

External links
 
 

1921 births
2012 deaths
American contract bridge players
Bermuda Bowl players
Sportspeople from Miami
Sportspeople from Winnipeg
University of Minnesota alumni
Canadian emigrants to the United States